Havering’s Grove is a village in Essex, most of which lies in the Borough of Brentwood, with part in the Borough of Basildon. It is situated on the A129 London to Southend Road. The settlement, which developed in the twentieth century, covers an extensive area, but has a low population due to low density nature of the plotland and A129 ribbon developments that constitute most of the village.

Etymology
Havering’s Grove takes its name from a wood, first mentioned as Haueringewode in 1291, much of which was destroyed by plotland development. It is not clear what association there was between the wood and the Royal Liberty of Havering.

Havering's Grove Brook
The is a watercourse, a tributary of the River Wid, called Havering Grove’s Brook, and the bridge that carries the A129 over the brook is called Havering’s Grove Bridge. The brook, or parts of it are also known as Lapwater Brook.

The brook forms the boundary between the boroughs of Brentwood and Basildon.

Community
The village has a Residents' Association.

Administration and representation
The area covered by the modern village was historically part of the ancient parishes of Hutton and Mountnessing.

There is a Havering’s Grove Polling District in Brentwood Borough’s Hutton East Ward. The part in Basildon is part of the Burstead Ward.

References

Villages in Essex